The 1984 African Cup of Champions Clubs Final was a football tie held over two legs in November and December 1984 between Zamalek, and Shooting Stars.

Zamalek from Egypt won the final's two legs, with a score on aggregate 3–0, earning their 1st African Cup.

The day after the 2nd leg, Shooting Stars FC were disbanded by the government for "putting shame on Nigeria".

Match details

First leg

Second leg

Notes and references

External links

1984
1
CCL
ACCC